Tizza Covi (1971, in Bolzano) is an Italian screenwriter and director. She lived in Paris and Berlin before studying photography in Vienna. After finishing her studies she went to Rome where she worked as a photographer.

Since 1996 she works together with Rainer Frimmel on films, theatre, and photography. 
In 2002 they founded their own film production company, Vento Film, to produce their films independently. 
They have won several awards for their documentaries, including the Wolfgang-Staudte-Award at the Berlinale for Babooska.

La Pivellina is their first fiction feature film and has been screened worldwide in more than 130 International Film Festivals. The film has received numerous international awards including the Europa Cinemas Label in Cannes and was selected as the Austrian entry for the Best Foreign Language Film at the 83rd Academy Awards, but didn't make the final shortlist.
Their second feature film, The shine of day, premiered in the international competition in Locarno 2012 and won the Silver Leopard for Best Actor.
The film was also awarded as Best Austrian Movie of the year at the Diagonale, and won the Max Ophüls Award in Saarbrücken 2013.

Their third movie "Mister Universo" was part of the International competition in Locarno and picked up 5 awards, among other a special mention of the International Jury, the Europa Cinema Label and the Fipresci Award.

Her new movie (again with Rainer Frimmel) "Notes from the Underworld" will have his world premiere in February 2020 at Berlinale International Film Festival in the section Berlinale Documents.

Filmography
2001:   Das ist alles  (That’s all)
2005:   Babooska
2009:   La Pivellina
2012:   Der Glanz des Tages (The shine of day)
2016: Mister Universo
2020: Notes from the Underworld
2022: Vera

References

External links

 
 Short Bio at VentoFilm

Further reading

 Austrian Film Commission: Interview with Tizza Covi and Rainer Frimmel about La Pivellina
indieWire: New Directors/New Films '10 - Directing Duo on the Documentary Approach They Took to “La Pivellina”
Variety: Austria makes Oscar choices
CinemaItaliano.info: Tizza Covi
The Hollywood Reporter: La Pivellina - Film Review

Living people
Italian women screenwriters
Italian screenwriters
Italian women film directors
1971 births